Dani Deshon Dennis-Sutton is an American football defensive end for the Penn State Nittany Lions.

Early life and high school career
Dennis-Sutton attended McDonogh School in Owings Mills, Maryland. He played football, basketball and ran track in high school. A five-star recruit, he was selected to play in the 2022 All-American Bowl. Dennis-Sutton committed to Penn State University to play college football.

College career
Dennis-Sutton earned immediate playing time his true freshman year at Penn State in 2022. He recorded his first career sack in his second career game against Auburn.

References

External links
Penn State Nittany Lions bio

Living people

Year of birth missing (living people)
Players of American football from Maryland
American football defensive ends
Penn State Nittany Lions football players